Doctor Who Confidential is a documentary series created by the British Broadcasting Corporation (BBC) to complement the revival of the long-running British science fiction television series Doctor Who. Each episode was broadcast on BBC Three on Saturdays, immediately after the broadcast of the weekly television episode on BBC One. The first and second series episodes ran 30 minutes each; third series instalments ran 45 minutes. BBC Three also broadcast a cut-down edition of the programme, lasting 15 minutes, shown after the repeats on Sundays and Fridays and after the weekday evening repeats of earlier seasons. Confidential received its own version of the Doctor Who theme tune, at least three different versions of the theme appeared in the series.

In September 2011, the BBC announced the cancellation of the series as a cost-cutting measure. Fans attempted to reverse the decision using an online petition. The decision was criticised by writers for the show and the incumbent Doctor, Matt Smith.

In February 2013, Doctor Who Confidential was voted the best BBC Three show of all time in a Radio Times poll on their website.

Synopsis
The series is described as focusing on the human element of the series, Confidential features behind-the-scenes footage on the making of Doctor Who through clips and interviews with the cast, production crew and other people, including those who have participated in the television series over the years of its existence. Each episode deals with a different topic, and in most cases refers to the Doctor Who episode that preceded it. There have also been several episodes of Doctor Who Confidential broadcast apart from the showing of Doctor Who episodes.

Narrators
 David Tennant (series 1, episode "New Dimension" only.)
 Simon Pegg (series 1)
 Mark Gatiss (series 2)
 Anthony Head (series 3, 4, 2009–2010 specials)
 Noel Clarke (2009–2010 specials, episode "Desert Storm" only.)
 Alex Price (series 5)
 Russell Tovey (series 6)

"Greatest Moments", the "2010 specials", and "My Sarah Jane" primarily consisted of interviews and clips from the series featuring no primary host.

Episodes

Series overview
The following table dictates the season or series in question; singular specials are not included in episode counts. Not all networks listed aired every episode, a number of them only broadcast specific specials.

Series 1 (2005)

The first season was narrated by Simon Pegg (who played the Editor in "The Long Game") and produced and directed by Gillane Seaborne, airing at 7.45 pm. New episodes were broadcast on BBC Three immediately following the broadcast of Doctor Who, two documentary specials were made for broadcast on BBC One, incorporating material from the Confidential episodes. The first was broadcast on the evening of the first episode, "Rose", and was narrated by David Tennant, prior to his being named as the Tenth Doctor. The second was broadcast immediately prior to the final episode, "The Parting of the Ways", and was narrated by Pegg. These episodes were not given the Confidential title, and are therefore separate from the series proper. Thirdly, a special DVD-only episode of the series, containing behind-the-scenes information on "The Christmas Invasion", was also made by the production team for release on the set.

Series 2 (2006)

A second season of Doctor Who Confidential was commissioned to accompany the 2006 series. Mark Gatiss replaced Pegg as narrator. Episodes continued to be broadcast on BBC Three along with a documentary special that was made for broadcast on BBC One on the day of the 2006 Christmas Special.

Series 3 (2007)

Anthony Head (who played Mr Finch/Brother Lassar in "School Reunion") replaced Gatiss as narrator for this series, whilst David Tennant did the entirety of the series' eleventh episode himself. The episode running length was increased to 45 minutes. A 30-minute special was shown as part of the BBC's arts' season, it was narrated by Tom Baker. After the 2007 Christmas Special, an episode was broadcast on BBC Three, again narrated by Anthony Head.

Series 4 (2008)

Anthony Head narrated the series for the second year in a row. Each episode had its own unique title sequence, with behind-the-scenes shots from that week's episode of Doctor Who. The 2008 Christmas special was the first to be accompanied by its own Confidential episode. The final episode reviewed all 10 previous incarnations of the Doctor, and exclusively revealed Matt Smith as the actor who would portray the then-upcoming Eleventh Doctor. A special episode of Confidential, going behind the scenes at the proms, was available by red button on 1 January 2009.

Specials (2009–2010)

The first Confidential edition attached to the 2009 specials, covering "Planet of the Dead", was narrated by Noel Clarke, although Anthony Head returned to narrate "Is There Life on Mars?". This special featured improved graphics in its opening and closing credits sequences. Head continued to narrate the Christmas and New Year specials.

Greatest Moments (2009)

Series 5 (2010)

Alex Price is the narrator for this series.

Specials (2010)

My Sarah Jane: A Tribute to Elisabeth Sladen (2011)

Series 6 (2011)

A new series of Confidential started broadcasting on 23 April 2011 with a brand new title sequence. Russell Tovey continued to narrate the episodes. The final episode, which aired on 1 October 2011, incorporated a mini-episode, Death is the Only Answer, written by a group of schoolchildren who won a contest co-sponsored by Confidential.

Broadcast

Series 1–2
In addition to being broadcast on BBC Three, each episode of Confidential was also made available for viewing on the Doctor Who Confidential website. Initially, repeat airings of the series were the full length episodes; however, beginning with Episode 6, BBC Three broadcast fifteen-minute versions, entitled Doctor Who Confidential: Cut Down, containing only the new series-related footage were released on the Series 1 DVD box set. There are no plans to release the full versions of the episodes in any format.

For series two, a special episode of the programme was produced for BBC's Doctor Who Night on 9 April 2006. Due to a wide range of schedule changes that either delayed or altered transmission of Doctor Who, the series aired at various times during its run. Unlike the first series, no episodes were webcast. These were also released on the DVD in edited-down format (once again subtitled Cut Down); the first episode of the season, "One Year On", was not released to DVD. A documentary special that was made for broadcast on BBC One on the day of "The Runaway Bride". The special was broadcast with the "Confidential" title (albeit with "Christmas Special" attached), opening theme, and unique titles (with images from "The Runaway Bride") and followed the creation of the Doctor Who: A Celebration concert.

Series 3–4, and the 2009–2010 specials
The episode running length was increased to 45 minutes for the third series, with 30-minute and 15-minute versions also prepared for broadcast. The 15-minute versions were available for download from the official website. As per previous seasons, all regular episodes were edited down into shorter versions for inclusion on the DVD release; for the first time, however, a complete Confidential episode was included on the DVD release: the "Music & Monsters" special. One episode, covering the making of the Children in Need special "Time Crash" was posted on the Children in Need website after the scene's airing. A 30-minute special, created by the Confidential team, was shown as part of the BBC's arts' season, entitled "On Show - Designs on Doctor Who", was first broadcast on BBC Two Wales. After "Voyage of the Damned", an episode was broadcast on BBC Three.

The 2008–10 specials were the first Confidential editions to be broadcast on BBC HD as well as BBC Three. The series also made a move to a high definition format. The full episodes of Confidential relating to the 2008–10 specials are available for immediate broadcast through Amazon Prime Video in the United States with an Amazon Prime subscription. These are the only full episodes of Confidential legally available for video-on-demand streaming. A 30-minute "best moments" feature was included on the DVD release of the Cybermen Collection.

Series 5–6, the 2010 specials, and the My Sarah Jane special
Episodes continued to be broadcast on BBC Three and BBC HD for series five and six. Similar to previous series, versions of the episodes entitled Cut Down were released on the DVD sets however, the full episode of Confidential relating to A Christmas Carol was released instead. Two specials were created between series five and six, on which was made specifically for broadcast on BBC America. A third special commemorating the death of Elisabeth Sladen was produced by the Confidential team as well and was aired on CBBC.

Cancellation
On 28 September 2011, a few days prior to the broadcast of the Confidential episode to accompany season 6 finale "The Wedding of River Song", BBC controller Zai Bennett announced the cancellation of the series as a cost-cutting measure. Within 24 hours of the show being officially cancelled, pages on both Facebook and Twitter were established in an attempt to save it, both with links to an online petition that gained over 20,000 signatures within the same period, and eventually garnered over 50,000. People involved with the show such as writers Neil Gaiman ("The Doctor's Wife") and Tom MacRae ("The Girl Who Waited") expressed their concern with the axing of the programme, as did lead actor Matt Smith.

Online featurettes
In 2012, seventh series executive producer Caroline Skinner announced that smaller behind-the-scenes featurettes would be released on the BBC's Doctor Who website to make up for Confidential cancellation. The majority of these featurettes last for less than 5 minutes.

Series 7 (2012–2013)

Specials (2013)

Post-cancellation
On 20 August 2014, it was announced that a series of 10-minute behind-the-scenes featurettes would accompany the twelve episodes of the eighth series, under the title of Doctor Who Extra. These featurettes were made available on the BBC's iPlayer and Red Button services.

Other shows in Confidential format
Following the popularity of Doctor Who Confidential, Doctor Who spin-off Torchwood was produced with its own set of backstage documentaries entitled Torchwood Declassified. The BBC also broadcast Heroes Unmasked in the same format, narrated by Anthony Head, to complement the NBC series Heroes on BBC Two, and Greek Uncovered, narrated by Fearne Cotton, for the comedy drama Greek when it was shown on BBC Three. The BBC Radio 7 broadcasts of Big Finish Doctor Who audio dramas are followed by a 15-minute backstage programme called Beyond the Vortex.

References

External links

 
 
 
 

2000s British documentary television series
2005 British television series debuts
2010s British documentary television series
2011 British television series endings
Aftershows
BBC Television shows
Doctor Who spin-offs
English-language television shows
Works about Doctor Who